A riding school bus is a group of schoolchildren supervised by one or more adults, riding bicycles along a set route, picking children up at their homes along the way until they all arrive at school.  Riding school buses are similar to walking bus or bike bus programs. Like a traditional bus, riding school buses (also known as RSBs) have a fixed route with designated "bus stops" and "pick up times" in which they pick up children. Ideally the riding school bus will include at least 1 adult ‘driver’, who leads the group, and an adult ‘conductor' who supervises from the end of the group.

Riding school bus programs have been developed in a number of local councils in Victoria, Australia, including City of Moreland and Shire of East Gippsland.

Riding school bus programs deliver a number of benefits:
Improvement in child fitness and health
Environmental benefits - reduction in car trips and associated air pollution
Development of traffic skills and confidence in children
Socialization and increased community engagement for children
Reduction of traffic congestion around schools

Riding school buses are also known as pedal pods or Cycling School Buses.

See also
Autobus (cycling)
Bike bus
Childhood obesity
Lack of physical education
Social influences on fitness behavior
Walking bus

References 

Physical exercise
Cycling safety
Student transport